The 2022 Copa Verde was the 9th edition of the football competition held in Brazil. Featuring 17 clubs, Acre, Mato Grosso, Pará and Roraima have two vacancies; Amazonas, Distrito Federal, Espírito Santo, Goiás, Mato Grosso do Sul, Rondônia and Tocantins with one each. The others two berths was set according to CBF ranking. Initially, the competition was to be formed by 24 clubs, but seven dropped out.

In the finals, Paysandu defeated Vila Nova 4–3 on penalties after tied 1–1 on aggregate to win their third title and a place in the third round of the 2023 Copa do Brasil.

Qualified teams

Note: Atlético Goianiense, Ceilândia, Grêmio Anápolis, Manaus, Nova Venécia, Remo and Trem were qualified, but dropped out.

Schedule
The schedule of the competition is as follows.

First round
In the first round, each tie was played on a single-legged basis. The higher-ranked team hosted the match.  If the score was level, the match would go straight to the penalty shoot-out to determine the winner.

|}

Round of 16
In the round of 16, each tie was played on a single-legged basis. The higher-ranked team hosted the match.  If the score was level, the match would go straight to the penalty shoot-out to determine the winner.

|}

Quarter-finals
In the quarter-finals, each tie was played on a single-legged basis. The higher-ranked team hosted the match. If the score was level, the match would go straight to the penalty shoot-out to determine the winner.

|}

Bracket
From the semi-finals, each tie was played on a home-and-away two-legged basis. The higher-ranked team hosted the second match. If the aggregate score was level, the second-leg match would go straight to the penalty shoot-out to determine the winners.

Finals

Tied 1–1 on aggregate, Paysandu won on penalties.

References

Copa Verde
2022 in Brazilian football